Ross Gibson Smith (born 8 September 1942) is a former Australian rules footballer who played in the Victorian Football League (VFL).

Smith played with St Kilda as a courageous rover. He won the Brownlow Medal in 1967 and captained Victoria at the 1972 Perth Carnival. He once broke his arm smothering a ball in the late sixties and recovered to captain the Saints in the early seventies.

He coached Subiaco to a premiership in 1973. He also coached his former club St Kilda for a single season (1977), leading them only three wins and to their first wooden spoon in 22 years.

He also went on to lecture in physical education at Rusden SCV in Melbourne during the 1980s.

He was inducted to the Saints inaugural Hall of Fame in 2003. In addition he was chosen as first rover in St Kilda's Team of the Century.

References 

St Kilda Hall of Fame Profile
Saints honour roll

Brownlow Medal winners
St Kilda Football Club players
St Kilda Football Club Premiership players
St Kilda Football Club coaches
Trevor Barker Award winners
Subiaco Football Club players
Subiaco Football Club coaches
Australian rules footballers from Victoria (Australia)
Australian Football Hall of Fame inductees
1942 births
Living people
One-time VFL/AFL Premiership players
Australian schoolteachers
Australian sports executives and administrators